Katherine Ingrid Kellgren or Kjellgren (1969 – January 10, 2018) was an American actress, known for her narration of audiobooks.

Personal life and education 
Kellgren was born in 1969 in New York City, though she undertook a large proportion of her schooling in London. She studied acting at the London Academy of Music and Dramatic Art.

In 2011, Kellgren married writer David Cote in 2011.

She died on January 10, 2018, at Memorial Sloan Kettering Cancer Center from complications of cancer.

Career 
Kellgren recorded radio plays early in her career, which prepared her for audiobook reader work.

Kellgren recorded over three hundred audiobooks. She was a multiple winner of the Audie Award and among her titles are five recipients of the American Library Association's Odyssey Award, as well as numerous AudioFile Earphones Awards, Publishers Weekly Listen Up Awards, and ForeWord Magazines Audiobook of the Year. She was named a Voice of Choice by Booklist magazine, and is on AudioFile magazine's list of Golden Voices.

In addition to her audiobook work, Kellgren performed on the stage, notably Laura in The Glass Menagerie in 2003 with the Shakespeare Theater of New Jersey.

Awards and honors
As a narrator, Kellgren was the 2011 Booklist Voice of Choice. AudioFile named her a Golden Voice Narrator. She won 11 Audie Awards and 43 Earphone Awards and was a finalist for numerous other awards.

Awards

"Best of" lists

References

External links 
 
AudioFile Magazine Spotlight
Behind-the-Scenes Tour of Audible, by Katherine Kellgren. 

1960s births
2018 deaths
Actresses from New York City
American voice actresses
Place of death missing
Alumni of the London Academy of Music and Dramatic Art
Date of birth missing
Audiobook narrators
21st-century American women